Minnan, Banlam or Minnan Golden Triangle, refers to the coastal region in Southern Fujian Province, China, which includes the prefecture-level cities of Xiamen, Quanzhou and Zhangzhou. The region accounts for 40 percent of the GDP of Fujian Province. It is the native homeland of the Hokkien people who speak the Hokkien language or Minnan language, a variety of Southern Min.

Other terms used on the Minnan region include the one sinologist G. William Skinner used, which was the term Zhang-Quan to describe the region in his guide to the physiographic macroregions of China.

References 

Fujian
Regions of China